The Men's Overall in the 2020 FIS Alpine Skiing World Cup consisted of 36 events in 6 disciplines: downhill (DH), Super-G (SG), giant slalom (GS), slalom (SL), Alpine combined (AC), and parallel (PAR). The season was originally scheduled to have 44 men's races plus a mixed team event, but a race in Japan plus final the seven men's races and the mixed team event were all cancelled, as discussed below.

A new overall champion was certain to be crowned, as Marcel Hirscher of Austria, the winner of the previous 8 World Cup overall titles, had retired at the end of the 2019 season, and all winners prior to him had also retired. And the battle eventually turned into a three-man battle between two Norwegians -- Aleksander Aamodt Kilde, a speed specialist, and Henrik Kristoffersen, a technical specialist -- and a Frenchman -- Alexis Pinturault, who competes in all disciplines.

After only canceling one race all season (in Japan) thanks to aggressive rescheduling, the season was terminated with the final seven events all being canceled.  The first was cancelled due to wind and fog; the following six were all canceled due to the COVID-19 pandemic.  The last event completed prior to the premature shutdown was a downhill at Kvitfjell, and in that race, Kilde (who finished second, worth 80 points) grabbed the overall lead by 54 points from Pinturault (who failed to finish in the top 30 and thus did not score). When the season never resumed after that race, Kilde clinched the overall season championship and the crystal globe that goes with it.

Standings

See also
 2020 Alpine Skiing World Cup – Men's summary rankings
 2020 Alpine Skiing World Cup – Men's Downhill
 2020 Alpine Skiing World Cup – Men's Super-G
 2020 Alpine Skiing World Cup – Men's Giant Slalom
 2020 Alpine Skiing World Cup – Men's Slalom
 2020 Alpine Skiing World Cup – Men's Combined
 2020 Alpine Skiing World Cup – Men's Parallel
 2020 Alpine Skiing World Cup – Women's Overall
 World Cup scoring system

References

External links
 Alpine Skiing at FIS website

Men's Overall
FIS Alpine Ski World Cup overall titles